Grušino is a village in the municipality of Aračinovo, Republic of North Macedonia.

Demographics
According to the 2021 census, the village had a total of 883 inhabitants. Ethnic groups in the village include:
Albanians 854
Macedonians 2
Others 27

References

Villages in Aračinovo Municipality
Albanian communities in North Macedonia